"Flowers" is a song recorded by R&B group the Emotions, and the title track to their 1976 album. It was released as a single in May 1976 by Columbia Records. The single reached No. 16 on the US Billboard Hot Soul Singles chart and No. 2 on the New Zealand Singles chart.

Overview
"Flowers" was produced by EWF bandleader Maurice White and Charles Stepney. The track was composed by White with Al McKay.

Critical reception
AllMusic described "Flowers" as a song which "smoothes the mood with the girl's sweet R&B vocals.

Charts

References

1976 songs
1976 singles
The Emotions songs
Songs written by Maurice White
Songs written by Al McKay
Columbia Records singles